Hackforth is a small village and civil parish in the Hambleton district of North Yorkshire, England, about  north of Bedale. Nearby settlements include Langthorne and Crakehall.

History 
Hackforth was mentioned in the Domesday Book in 1086 as being in the hundred of "Land of Count Alan" and the county of Yorkshire, the population was estimated at 6 households.

In 1870-72 John Marius Wilson's Imperial Gazetteer of England and Wales described Tunstall as:"a township in Hornby parish, N. R. Yorkshire; 4¼ miles NNW of Bedale. Acres, 1, 264. Real property, £1, 957. Pop., 1 67. Houses, 28. The property belongs to the Duke of Leeds. Bishop Tunstall was a native."As mentioned in the gazetteer, Hackforth was the birthplace of Cuthbert Tunstall, who served as the Prince-Bishop of Durham on two occasions between the years of 1530 and 1559, during the reigns of Henry VIII, Edward VI, Mary I and Elizabeth I.

Governance 
The village lies within the Richmond (Yorks) parliamentary constituency, which is under the control of the Conservative Party. The current Member of Parliament, since the 2015 general election, is Rishi Sunak. Hackforth also lies within the Bedale ward of Hambleton District Council.

Community and culture 
The village is served by a primary school, Hackforth and Hornby CofE, with a capacity for 42 pupils. Hackforth has a public house, The Greyhound, and a village hall built in 1936 which has also been used as a live music venue since 2013, hosting acts such as The Dunwells.

References

External links

Villages in North Yorkshire
Civil parishes in North Yorkshire